The  flows through Gifu and Aichi prefectures in Japan. It empties into the Shin River, which is part of the Shōnai River system.

Geography
The sakura on the banks of the river in Ōguchi, Konan, and Iwakura are Japan's Top 100 sakura list.

River communities
 Gifu Prefecture
 Tajimi
 Aichi Prefecture
 Inuyama, Ōguchi, Konan, Ichinomiya, Iwakura, Komaki, Kitanagoya, Ichinomiya, Inazawa, Kiyosu, Ama

References

Rivers of Gifu Prefecture
Rivers of Aichi Prefecture
Rivers of Japan